Eudonia paghmanella is a moth in the family Crambidae. It was described by Patrice J.A. Leraut in 1985. It is found in Afghanistan.

References

Moths described in 1985
Eudonia